Hammeria is a genus of flowering plants belonging to the family Aizoaceae.

It is native to the Cape Provinces of the South African Republic.

The genus name of Hammeria is in honour of Steven A. Hammer (b. 1951), American botanist, horticulturist and plant collector and specialist in Conophytum. It was first described and published in Cact. Succ. J. (Los Angeles) Vol.70 on page 204 in 1998.

Known species, according to Kew:
Hammeria cedarbergensis 
Hammeria gracilis 
Hammeria meleagris

References

Aizoaceae
Aizoaceae genera
Plants described in 1998
Flora of the Cape Provinces